USS Ready may refer to the following ships of the United States Navy:

  , a patrol gunboat in World War II
  , a patrol gunboat in the Vietnam War

United States Navy ship names